The Eleventh Chapter  is a 2019 Chinese dark comedy-drama film co-written and directed by Chen Jianbin, and starring Chen Jianbin, Zhou Xun, Dong Chengpeng, Leah Dou and Jessie Li. The film was premiered at the 9th Beijing International Film Festival in April, 2019 and launched at 33rd Golden Rooster Awards on November 26, 2020. It was officially released in China on April 2, 2021.

Synopsis
The local repertory theatre was rehearsing a play adapted from a real case. Ma Fuli, the person concerned, thought the story is inconsistent with the reality and asked for an explanation. His stepdaughter Jin Duoduo’s premarital pregnancy got the whole family into trouble. Duoduo finally decided to abort the baby as Ma cannot clear his name from the suspicion of murder. To protect the baby, Ma pushed himself and the theatre into greater difficulties

Cast
 Chen Jianbin as Ma Fuli
 Zhou Xun as Jin Cailing
 Leah Dou as Jin Duoduo
 Dong Chengpeng as Quentin Hu
 Jessie Li as Jia Meiyi
 Wang Xuebing as Lawyer Bai
 Song Jia as Zhen Manyu
 Niu Ben as Grandpa
 Liu Jinshan as Gou Yewu
 Qian Yu as Fu Kusi
 Jia Bing as brother Pi
 Huang Jianxin as leader
 Shi Hang as Dr. Hei
 Ling Fan as actress
 Li Jiuxiao as Zhen Dehua
 Zhang Junyi as Yao Danni
 Wu Enxuan as Xiao Dai
 Li Luqi as  Liu Yisi

Soundtrack
Credits from QQ Music

Awards and nominations

References

External links
 
 

2019 films
2019 black comedy films
Chinese drama films
Chinese black comedy films